Sidney Fernbach (1917, Philadelphia, Pennsylvania - 1991) was an American physicist.

Life 
Fernbach studied physics at Temple University and the University of California, Berkeley. He worked as a physicist in the USA. 
Starting in 1952, he worked at the University of California Radiation Laboratory using computers to research nuclear weapons.
.
In 1992, the Sidney Fernbach Award was established after his death.

Awards 
 1987: W. Wallace McDowell Award

References

External links 
 IEEE Computer Society: Sidney Fernbach
 Interview with Fernbach

1917 births
1991 deaths
20th-century American physicists
Temple University alumni
University of California, Berkeley alumni
Fellows of the American Physical Society